Zhao family may refer to:

The aristocratic Zhao family in Jin (Chinese state) during the Spring and Autumn period 
Zhao (state) in the Warring States period, founded by the same family
The ruling house of Zhao dynasty (Nanyue) in southern China and northern Vietnam
House of Zhao, the imperial clan of the Chinese Song dynasty
Zhao family (Internet slang), a Chinese meme referring to bureaucrats and dignitaries

See also 
Zhao (surname)
Zhao (disambiguation)
The Orphan of Zhao, a Chinese drama concerning the aristocratic Zhao family in Jin